The legislative districts of Cebu are the representations of the province of Cebu in the various national legislatures of the Philippines. At present, the province is currently represented in the House of Representatives of the Philippines by its seven congressional districts, with their respective representatives being elected every three years. Locally, the districts are also allotted two seats in the Cebu Provincial Board, with board members also being elected every three years.

History 
Cebu was initially composed of one representative district, wherein it elected four representatives, at large, to the Malolos Congress in 1898. It was later divided into seven representative districts in 1907. When seats for the upper house of the Philippine Legislature were elected from territory-based districts between 1916 and 1935, the province formed part of the tenth senatorial district which elected two out of the 24-member senate.

In the disruption caused by the Second World War, two delegates represented the province in the National Assembly of the Japanese-sponsored Second Philippine Republic: one was the provincial governor (an ex officio member), while the other was elected through a provincial assembly of KALIBAPI members during the Japanese occupation of the Philippines. Cebu City, being a chartered city, was represented separately in this short-lived legislative body. Upon the restoration of the Philippine Commonwealth in 1945, the province retained its seven pre-war representative districts; this remained so until 1972.

The province was represented in the Interim Batasang Pambansa as part of Region VII from 1978 to 1984. Beginning in 1984 the province elected six representatives, at large, to the Regular Batasang Pambansa; Cebu City, which became a highly urbanized city in 1979 by virtue of Batas Pambansa Blg. 51, began to be represented separately from Cebu at this time.

Cebu, including the cities of Mandaue and Lapu-Lapu, was reapportioned into six congressional districts under the new Constitution which was proclaimed on February 11, 1987. The six districts elected members to the restored House of Representatives starting that same year.

The passage of Republic Act No. 9726 on October 22, 2009, separated the highly urbanized city of Lapu-Lapu from the sixth district to form its own congressional district starting in the 2010 elections.

Republic Act No. 10684, approved on September 18, 2015, split the second district and recreated the seventh district which elected its own representative in the 2016 elections.

Republic Act No. 11257, approved on April 15, 2019, separated the highly urbanized city of Mandaue from the sixth district to form its own congressional district starting in the 2022 elections.

Current districts 
The province was last redistricted in 2019, where Mandaue was separated from the sixth district to form its own congressional district. The province's current congressional delegation composes of three members of the National Unity Party, two members of Lakas, one member of the Nacionalista Party and one member of the Nationalist People's Coalition. All seven representatives are part of the majority bloc in the 19th Congress.

 City: Carcar (became city 2007), Naga (became city 2007), Talisay (became city 2000)
 Municipalities: Minglanilla, San Fernando, Sibonga
 Population (2020):  809,335

1907–1972 
 Municipalities: Bogo, Borbon Carmen, Catmon, Danao (became city 1961), Pilar, San Francisco, Tabogon, Tudela, Poro (re-established 1909), Sogod (re-established 1920)

2nd District 

 Municipalities: Alcoy, Argao, Boljoon, Dalaguete, Oslob, Samboan, Santander
 Population (2020):  257,658

1987–2016 

 Municipalities: Alcantara, Alcoy, Alegria, Argao, Badian, Boljoon, Dalaguete, Dumanjug, Ginatilan, Malabuyoc, Moalboal, Oslob, Samboan, Ronda, Santander

1907–1972 
 Municipalities: Cebu (became city 1936), Liloan, Mandaue (became city 1969), Opon (renamed as Lapu-Lapu and converted to a city on 1961), Cordova (re-established 1912), Compostela (re-established 1919), Consolacion (re-established 1920)

Notes

3rd District 

 City: Toledo
 Municipalities: Aloguinsan, Asturias, Balamban, Barili, Pinamungajan, Tuburan
 Population (2020):  616,326

1907–1972 
 Municipalities: Carcar, Minglanilla, Naga, San Fernando, Talisay

4th District 

 City: Bogo (became city 2007)
 Municipalities: Bantayan, Daanbantayan, Madridejos, Medellin, San Remigio, Santa Fe, Tabogon, Tabuelan
 Population (2020):  540,814

Notes

1907–1972 
 Municipalities: Argao, Dalaguete, Sibonga, Alcoy (re-established 1916)

5th District 

 City: Danao
 Municipalities: Borbon, Carmen, Catmon, Compostela, Liloan, Pilar, Poro, San Francisco, Sogod, Tudela
 Population (2020):  643,946

Notes

1907–1972 
 Municipalities: Alegria, Badian, Boljoon, Ginatilan, Malabuyoc, Moalboal, Oslob, Samboan, Alcantara (re-established 1913), Santander (re-established 1917)

6th District 

 Municipalities: Consolacion, Cordova
 Population (2020):  218,607

2010–2022
 City: Mandaue
 Municipalities: Consolacion, Cordova
 Population (2015):  553,894

Notes

1987–2010 
 Cities: Lapu-Lapu, Mandaue
 Municipalities: Consolacion, Cordova

Notes

7th District 
 Municipalities: Alcantara, Alegria, Badian, Dumanjug, Ginatilan, Malabuyoc, Moalboal, Ronda
 Population (2020): 238,699

1907–1972 

 Municipalities: Asturias, Balamban, Bantayan, Daanbantayan, Medellin, San Remigio, Tuburan, Santa Fe (re-established 1909), Madridejos (re-established 1916), Tabuelan (established 1953)

-->

At-Large (defunct)

1898–1899

1943–1944 
 Excludes Cebu City

1984–1986 
 Excludes Cebu City

See also 
 Legislative districts of Cebu City
 Legislative district of Lapu-Lapu
 Legislative district of Mandaue

References 

Cebu
Politics of Cebu